The Krongo Nuba are a sub-ethnic group of the Nuba peoples in the Nuba Mountains of South Kordofan state, in southern Sudan.  They number several 10,000 persons. This minority is divided in terms of religion.

They live in the Krongo Hills of the Nuba Mountains.

Language
They speak the Krongo language, a Nilo-Saharan language.

See also
Index: Nuba peoples

External links 
The Nuba Mountains Homepage

References
Joshua Project

Nuba peoples
Ethnic groups in Sudan